SNCA may refer to:

 Seoul National Capital Area, region in South Korea
 Sistema Nacional de Creadores de Arte, Mexican culture organization
 Alpha-synuclein, a protein found in neural tissue, encoded by the SNCA gene
 Society of North Carolina Archivists, a statewide organization for archivists, librarians, and other professionals involved in the care of manuscripts
 Swedish National Courts Administration, an administrative authority for the Swedish courts